Yaryzhensky is a rural locality (a khutor) in Beryozovskoye Rural Settlement, Novoanninsky District, Volgograd Oblast, Russia. The population was 171 as of 2010. There are 3 streets.

Geography 
Yaryzhensky is located in forest steppe on the Khopyorsko-Buzulukskaya Plain, on the right bank of the Buzuluk River, 30 km west of Novoanninsky (the district's administrative centre) by road. Kleymenovsky is the nearest rural locality.

References 

Rural localities in Novoanninsky District